The white-winged lark (Alauda leucoptera) is a species of lark found from southern Ukraine through Kazakhstan to south-central Russia. It is partially migratory, with birds tending to move south in winter. The southernmost birds are mainly resident. It is a very rare vagrant to western Europe.

Taxonomy and systematics
The current genus name is from the Latin for lark. The specific leucoptera means "white-winged", from leukos, "white", and pteron, "wing". Formerly, the white-winged lark was classified as belonging to the genus Melanocorypha until moved to Alauda in 2014.

Description
This lark with flashing white wing patches is large and robust, usually 17–19 cm in length, with a wingspan of 35 cm. Both sexes weigh about 44 g. In flight, it is unmistakable due to its striking wing pattern: black outer flight feathers, white inner flight feathers, and the rest of the wing chestnut. Its body is dark-streaked grey above and whitish below. The adult male has a chestnut crown, but the sexes are otherwise similar.

Vocalisations
Its song is a more melodious version of the Eurasian skylark's.

Behaviour and ecology

The white-winged lark lives in dry, open steppe and plains. It nests on the ground, laying three to eight eggs per clutch. Its diet consists of seeds, and insects during the breeding season. It is gregarious during the winter.

Threats
Habitat destruction due to ploughing is one of the main threats to the white-winged lark.

Status
Although its population has declined significantly, it is still relatively common, and is not considered to be at risk.

References

External links

BirdFacts - British Trust for Ornithology

white-winged lark
Birds of Europe
Birds of Central Asia
white-winged lark